Valeriu D. Cotea (May 11, 1926–April 21, 2016) was a Romanian oenologist. From 1976 to 2000, Cotea represented Romania at the International Organisation of Vine and Wine, based in Paris. He founded and led the Iași-based Oenology Research Centre of the Romanian Academy, based in Iași. He was elected a titular member of the Academy in 1993. Cotea died in Iași in 2016 following cardiac arrest provoked by choking on a slice of orange.  He was 89.

References

External links

1926 births
2016 deaths
People from Vrancea County
Oenologists
Titular members of the Romanian Academy
Deaths from choking